Edwin Marino Co Ongchuan is a Filipino politician from the province of Northern Samar. He is currently serving as the Governor of the province being first elected in 2019. He was a member of the  House of Representatives of the Philippines from 2016 to 2019.

References

External links
Province of Northern Samar

Living people
1968 births
Governors of Northern Samar
PDP–Laban politicians